Medicine Songs is a studio album by Buffy Sainte-Marie, released November 10, 2017, on True North Records. The album includes both new material and contemporary re-recordings of some of her older songs.

It was preceded by the single "You Got to Run (Spirit of the Wind)", a collaboration with Tanya Tagaq.

Background
Described by Sainte-Marie as "a collection of front-line songs of unity and resistance," Medicine Songs was released November 10, 2017 by True North Records. Produced in collaboration with Chris Birkett, the album features reworked and re-recorded material from throughout Sainte-Marie's career.

Promotion
As part of the Polaris Collaboration Session series, a video featuring Sainte-Marie and Tagaq performing "You Got to Run (Spirit of the Wind)" was released in February 2017. A music video for "The War Racket" was released in February 2018, animated by Kurt Swinghammer. Sainte-Marie promoted the album in late 2017, giving radio, podcast, print and television interviews where she often reflected on how she was blacklisted by mainstream American radio in the 1960s and 70s, as well as issues related to reconciliation.

Reception
Described by one reviewer as "unflinching in its focus," Medicine Songs was a follow up from 2015's Power in the Blood. Receiving generally positive reviews, one critic bemoaned the "flattening of time and history" with re-recorded protest songs losing some of the signature features of their times, and with the songs ordered out of chronological sequence.

Awards
At the Juno Awards of 2018, the album won the award for Indigenous Music Album of the Year. It was also a nominee for Contemporary Roots Album of the Year, but did not win in that category.

The album won the Best Folk Album award at the 2018 Indigenous Music Awards.

Track listing

References

2017 albums
Buffy Sainte-Marie albums
True North Records albums
Albums produced by Jon Levine
Juno Award for Indigenous Music Album of the Year albums